Dipterocarpus grandiflorus is a species of flowering plant in the Dipterocarpaceae family. It is an endangered medium hardwood tree in South-East Asia and India. Its wood is used to produce good quality charcoal, paper pulp, and timber sold under the Keruing designation. Its gum is used locally as a waterproofing varnish. The tree itself is very useful for nitrogen fixing, erosion control, soil improvement, and watershed regulation.

References

External links
 Entry in the World AgroForestryTree Database
 "Dipterocarpaceae in Thailand: taxonomic and biogeographical analysis", Thailand's National Park, Wildlife and Plant Conservation Department

grandiflorus
Trees of Indo-China
Trees of Malesia
Critically endangered flora of Asia
Taxa named by Francisco Manuel Blanco